Lantana urticoides, also known as Texas Lantana, is a three- to five-foot perennial shrub that grows in Mexico and the U.S. states of Texas, Louisiana and Mississippi especially along the Gulf coast. The plant can blossom from spring until the first frost. It is a species of flowering plant within the verbena family, Verbenaceae.

Etymology
The name Lantana derives from the Latin name of the wayfaring tree Viburnum lantana, the leaves of which closely resemble Lantana.

References

urticoides